Mamonty Yugry is a junior ice hockey team from Khanty-Mansiysk, which contains players from the Yugra Khanty-Mansiysk school. They are members of the Junior Hockey League (MHL), the top tier of junior hockey in the country.

External links 
Official Page

2011 establishments in Russia
HC Yugra
Ice hockey clubs established in 2011
Ice hockey teams in Russia
Junior Hockey League (Russia) teams